Julie Coulaud (born 7 August 1982) is a French former middle- and long-distance runner. She had most of her success in cross country running, with her career highlight being a silver medal at the 2007 European Cross Country Championships. She was a team bronze medallist at that competition in 2006 and was runner-up at the European Champion Clubs Cup Cross Country and World Military Cross Country Championships that same year.

Coulaud made four appearances at the IAAF World Cross Country Championships and represented France at the 2007 World Championships in Athletics, running in the 3000 metres steeplechase. She was briefly the French record holder in the latter event, with marks of 9:32:08 minutes then 9:31:43 minutes in June and July 2007. Sophie Duarte improved that time later in July that year.

After a positive doping test for excess testosterone and traces of anabolic substances in February 2008 she received a three-year ban from the sport.

Following her athletics ban, she received a suspended jail sentence of six months and a fine of €2000 for possession of restricted substances, after her cache of EPO, growth hormones and insulin was found. She responded to the court that she had obtained the substances through a Spanish doctor in Valencia. Coulaud retired from the sport internationally and focused on opening a clothes business.

Julie is the sister of Aurélie Coulaud, another well known French middle-distance runner
.

International competitions

National titles
French Cross Country Championships
Long course: 2006
Short course: 2002, 2003, 2005

See also
List of doping cases in athletics
France at the 2007 World Championships in Athletics

References

External links

Living people
1982 births
People from Saint-Chamond
French female long-distance runners
French female middle-distance runners
French female steeplechase runners
World Athletics Championships athletes for France
French sportspeople in doping cases
Doping cases in athletics
Sportspeople from Loire (department)
Athletes (track and field) at the 2005 Mediterranean Games
Mediterranean Games competitors for France
21st-century French women